Wilmore is a city in Comanche County, Kansas, United States.  As of the 2020 census, the population of the city was 37.

History
Wilmore was founded in about 1887. It was named for Thomas Wilmore, the first merchant in town.

The first post office in Wilmore was established on June 7, 1887.

Geography

Climate
The climate in this area is characterized by hot, humid summers and generally mild to cool winters.  According to the Köppen Climate Classification system, Wilmore has a humid subtropical climate, abbreviated "Cfa" on climate maps.

Demographics

2010 census
As of the census of 2010, there were 53 people, 27 households, and 19 families residing in the city. The racial makeup of the city was 100.0% White.

There were 27 households, of which 11.1% had children under the age of 18 living with them, 66.7% were married couples living together, 3.7% had a male householder with no wife present, and 29.6% were non-families. 25.9% of all households were made up of individuals, and 3.7% had someone living alone who was 65 years of age or older. The average household size was 1.96 and the average family size was 2.21.

The median age in the city was 54.4 years. 11.3% of residents were under the age of 18; 15.1% were between the ages of 18 and 24; 7.6% were from 25 to 44; 51% were from 45 to 64; and 15.1% were 65 years of age or older. The gender makeup of the city was 54.7% male and 45.3% female.

2000 census
As of the census of 2000, there were 57 people, 30 households, and 20 families residing in the city. The racial makeup of the city was 100.00% White.

There were 30 households, out of which 16.7% had children under the age of 18 living with them, 60.0% were married couples living together, and 33.3% were non-families. 33.3% of all households were made up of individuals, and 16.7% had someone living alone who was 65 years of age or older. The average household size was 1.90 and the average family size was 2.35.

In the city, the population was spread out, with 14.0% under the age of 18, 14.0% from 25 to 44, 40.4% from 45 to 64, and 31.6% who were 65 years of age or older. The median age was 54 years. For every 100 females, there were 111.1 males. For every 100 females age 18 and over, there were 104.2 males.

The median income for a household in the city was $16,786, and the median income for a family was $28,125. Males had a median income of $21,875 versus $13,750 for females. The per capita income for the city was $12,820. There were 25.0% of families and 27.1% of the population living below the poverty line, including no under eighteens and 31.6% of those over 64.

Education
The community is served by Comanche County USD 300 public school district.

Wilmore High School was closed through school unification. The Wilmore High School mascot was Tigers.

References

Further reading

External links
 Wilmore - Directory of Public Officials
 Wilmore City Map, KDOT

Cities in Kansas
Cities in Comanche County, Kansas